The Washington Supreme Court justices are elected at large by the voters of the state of Washington. The general election was held on November 4, 2008.

Justice Position 3

Justice Position 4

Justice Position 7

References

2008 Washington (state) elections
2008